The Snooker Shoot Out is a professional snooker tournament played under a variation of the standard rules. Each match consists of one frame, played over a maximum of 10 minutes, with a shot clock in effect. First staged in 1990 as the Shoot-Out, the event was revived in 2011 and renamed the Snooker Shoot Out. Held from 2011 to 2016 as a non-ranking event with 64 competitors, it became a ranking event in 2017 for an expanded field of 128 players.

The event is notable for its wildcard entrants, including young amateur players. Liam Davies first competed in 2019 when he was 12 years old, making him the youngest player to feature in a professional ranking event. At the 2023 edition, 14-year-old Vladislav Gradinari became the youngest player to win a televised match at a ranking event, and Reanne Evans became the first female player to achieve the same feat. The Snooker Shoot Out has never been won by a player ranked inside the top 16, although Stuart Bingham, Mark Selby, and Mark Williams have all reached finals. The current champion is Chris Wakelin.

Unlike other major snooker tournaments, the audience is not expected to remain silent during play, and the event has become known for its boisterous atmosphere.

History
Single frame snooker competition was a staple of early televised coverage of the sport, and largely responsible for bringing the game to the mainstream of British sport, primarily through the BBC's popular Pot Black programme. Extended televised coverage of longer professional tournaments, however, had caused the format to become jaded, with the last Pot Black tournament taking place in 2007.

A similar event known as Shoot-Out was first held in September 1990, when, except in the final, all matches were decided over a single frame. With the demise of Pot Black, the event returned in 2011 with several innovations, and was renamed to Snooker Shoot Out. It was sponsored by CaesarsCasino.com.

It was a one-frame shoot-out with a random draw, where the winner is given £32,000. The top 64 players in the world rankings contested the tournament, which was shown on Sky Sports and ITV4. The 2011 event was the first time that Sky Sports had shown a World Snooker event live since 2004. From 2011 to 2015 the event took place at the Circus Arena in Blackpool. The event was sponsored by PartyPoker.com in 2012, by Betfair in 2013, by 888casino in 2014, and by Betway in 2015. The tournament was held at the Hexagon in Reading for 2016. From 2016 to 2018, the tournament was broadcast by ITV and was sponsored by Coral. In 2017, the tournament became a ranking event for the first time, open to all 128 professional players. At the end of the season, the players voted to keep it as a ranking event. From 2017 the tournament was staged at the Colosseum in Watford. In 2018, the event agreed a long-term deal with Eurosport and Quest to broadcast the event in the United Kingdom until 2026, beginning with the 2019 Snooker Shoot Out.

In January 2023, Reanne Evans became the first female winner of a Snooker Shoot Out match as well as the first woman to win a televised match at a ranking event.

Format
Rules by the World Professional Billiards and Snooker Association:
 Every frame lasts a maximum of 10 minutes.
 There is a shot clock. For the first 5 minutes of the match, players have 15 seconds per shot, but for the last 5 minutes this is reduced to 10 seconds. Prior to 2013, the shot clock was set at 20 seconds per shot for the first 5 minutes and 15 seconds for the last 5 minutes. Failure to strike the cue ball within the time allowed results in a minimum 5 points penalty or the value of the ball 'on', whichever is greater. Prior to 2018, it was always a 5 points penalty. In 2021, normal rules regarding foul points are used.
Failure to do so results in a minimum 5 points penalty or the value of the ball 'on', whichever is greater. Prior to 2018, it was always a 5 points penalty.
 Players '' for who .
 In an event of a tie the  shoot-out determines the winner. The winner of the lag decides who goes first. The players make alternate attempts until one player has potted the blue more times than his or her opponent after taking the same number of shots. The blue must be potted directly, without touching a cushion other than the jaws of the intended pocket.

Winners

Century breaks 

Total: 28

 142  Mark Allen (2021)
 139  Thepchaiya Un-Nooh (2019)
 135, 116, 100  Martin Gould (2012, 2015, 2019)
 133  Luca Brecel (2019)
 133  Thor Chuan Leong (2020)
 132  Ricky Walden (2019)
 129, 113  Ronnie O'Sullivan (2011)
 127  David Gilbert (2016)
 125  Mark Selby (2013)
 123  Hossein Vafaei (2022)
 121  Stephen Lee (2012)
 120  Tony Knowles (1990)
 120  Chang Bingyu (2020)
 119  Chris Wakelin (2023)
 117  Ali Carter (2023)
 116  Michael Holt (2023)
 112  Mark King (2011)
 109  Michael Georgiou (2018)
 107  Jak Jones (2020)
 106, 101  Xiao Guodong (2020, 2023)
 106  Alfie Burden (2011)
 103  Allan Taylor (2022)
 102  Mark Davis (2018)
 101  Ryan Day (2014)

Records
 Michael Holt has played (42) and won (30) the most matches in the tournament's history.
 Paul Davison has entered the tournament 7 times without winning a match.
 Robin Hull has the best winning record in terms of percentages, winning 87.5% of his matches (7 out of 8 played).
 When it comes to the winners trying to defend their title, as of the 2023 tournament, 5 of the winners have lost in the 1st round the year after winning the trophy; the best performance by a defending champion was by Barry Hawkins, who reached the quarter-final stage.
 Barry Pinches, Nigel Bond, Rod Lawler, and Ken Doherty all competed in the original event back in 1990, and also took part in the 2022 tournament.
 The highest break in Shoot Out history is 142 by Mark Allen in 2021.
 The lowest aggregate score is 13, recorded when Oliver Lines beat Stan Moody 11–2 in 2022. Hammim Hussain's 9-7 victory over Peter Lines the previous year is still the lowest winning score. The previous lowest for both records was in 2019, when Ryan Davies beat Sunny Akani 10–7.
 Only one century break has been recorded in a final, by Chris Wakelin in 2023.

Notes

References

 
Snooker variants
Recurring sporting events established in 1990
1990 establishments in England
Snooker competitions in England
Snooker ranking tournaments
Snooker non-ranking competitions